Leonard Nimoy (March 26, 1931 – February 27, 2015) was an American actor who had a career in film and television for seven decades. Nimoy's breakthrough role was his portrayal of Spock in Star Trek.

Nimoy began his acting career in his early twenties, teaching acting classes in Hollywood and making minor film and television appearances through the 1950s. From 1959 to 1962 he appeared in four episodes of Wagon Train, as well as playing the title role in Kid Monk Baroni. Foreshadowing his fame as a semi-alien, he played Narab, one of three Martian invaders, in the 1952 movie serial Zombies of the Stratosphere. From 1959 to 1962 he appeared in four episodes of Wagon Train.

His breakthrough character Spock, which he played in Star Trek and its animated series and film adaptations, made a significant cultural impact and earned Nimoy three Emmy Award nominations. TV Guide named Spock one of the 50 greatest TV characters. After the original Star Trek series, Nimoy starred in Mission: Impossible for two seasons, hosted the documentary series In Search of..., made several well-received stage appearances, and played villain Doctor Kibner in the 1978 remake of Invasion of the Body Snatchers. In the 1990s, he reprised his role as Spock in a two-part episode of the Star Trek: The Next Generation and the first two Star Trek reboot films, and went on to voice Spock in Star Trek Online. In 2016, one year after his death, Nimoy appeared posthumously in the documentary For the Love of Spock.

Film

Television

References

External links 

Works by Leonard Nimoy
Male actor filmographies
Director filmographies
American filmographies